, son of regent Kaneyoshi, was a kugyō or court noble of the Muromachi period (1336–1573) of Japan. He held a regent position kampaku two times from 1488 to 1493 and from 1497 to 1501. He adopted Fusamichi as son who was also his daughter's husband.

Family
 Father: Ichijo Kaneyoshi
 Mother: Minami no Kata (1443-1490)
 Wife: daughter of Nijo Masatsugu
 Daughter: married Ichijo Fusamichi

References
 

1465 births
1514 deaths
Fujiwara clan
Ichijō family
People of Muromachi-period Japan